Ge'ez Braille is the braille alphabet for all Ethiopic languages. Letter values are mostly in line with international usage.

Alphabet
Ge'ez Braille is a consonant–vowel alphabet, not an abugida like the print Ge'ez script. However, because the alphabetic chart (right) is organized by syllable rather than by letter, the vowels, which do not occur alone, are given first in the chart below, then the consonants are listed in Ge'ez order.

The syllabic chart at right shows a blank cell  being used for the vowel .  This is perhaps an artefact of the presentation; UNESCO (2013) shows it as a zero vowel that is simply not written.  

 is not the default vowel in print Amharic, which is instead  (braille ).  For example, el + vowel is written ለ  lä, ሉ  lu, ሊ  li, ላ  la, ሌ  le, ል  lə, ሎ  lo, ሏ  lwa. 

CwV and CyV other than Cwa are written with medial w and y: ገ  gä, ጉ  gu, ጊ  gi, ጋ  ga, ጌ  ge, ግ  gə, ጎ  go, ጐ  gwä, ጒ  gwi, ጓ  gwa, ጔ  gwe, ጕ  gwə.  Note that Cwə is written as if it were Cwu, a sequence which does not occur in Ethiopic languages.

Numbers 
Ethiopic digits do not follow the international pattern.  They are also circumfixed with  ... :

The form of 100 suggests that the prefix  may occur before each digit, while the suffix  occurs only at the end of the number.

Punctuation

Native punctuation is as follows:

The last is a 'tonal mark'.

There is also Western punctuation:

References

Ethiopic Braille at Adaptive Technology Center for the Blind, Addis Ababa

French-ordered braille alphabets
Amharic language